The Vaccine Damage Payment Act 1979 is an Act of the Parliament of the United Kingdom that regulates the extraction of monetary compensation from public funds.

It was introduced following concerns over the pertussis vaccine.

References

United Kingdom Acts of Parliament 1979
Health and safety in the United Kingdom
Safety codes
Occupational safety and health law
Vaccines
Public health in the United Kingdom
2017 in British law
1979 in British law
Acts of the Parliament of the United Kingdom concerning healthcare